Senator Christie may refer to:

Gabriel Christie (Maryland politician) (1756–1808), Maryland State Senate
Robert Christie Jr. (1824–1875), New York State Senate